120 Krh/40 is a 120 mm mortar developed by the Finnish company Tampella (now Patria Vammas).

Use in Sweden 

The 120 Krh/40 first entered service in 1940 after being ordered the previous year by Finland. It was exported to Sweden between 1941 and 1944 and later produced under license there. A total of 219 were exported by Tampella. The Swedish military calls them 12 cm  m/41 and they have continued to serve as the standard heavy mortar of the Swedish Army. In 1956, their base-plates were replaced by Swedish-manufactured Hotchkiss-Brandt M-56 baseplates. , 165 m/41D are still in service in the Estonian Land Forces and 22 are held by the Lithuanian Armed Forces.

They got a major increase in lethality when the STRIX top attack anti armour round was introduced in the 1990s; it is a smart weapon that homes in on the IR signature of armoured vehicles.

See also 
 Soltam M-65 – an Israeli copy of Krh/40 using a new base plate
 Soltam K6 – further development of M-65

References

External links 

Tampella
120mm mortars
Infantry mortars
Artillery of Sweden
World War II military equipment of Finland
Mortars of Finland
Weapons and ammunition introduced in 1940